Nymphaion (Nymphaîon) was the name given to the ancient sanctuary of the "eternal fire" located in southern Illyria, near Apollonia in modern-day Albania.  Placed inland on the Vjosë/Aoos river. Pliny the Elder mentions the area was inhabited by the local Illyrian Bylliones and (Illyrian or Epirote) Amantes and was at some point included in the broader territory of Apollonia. The ancient site has been identified with the Selenica area, across from Byllis, a region rich in natural reserves of petroleum and gas, which were required to feed the eternal fire. Selenicë is still a modern producer of hydrocarbons and high quality bitumen.

Description 

The area had already been occupied by Illyrians before the founding of nearby Apollonia by a joint colony of Corinth and Kerkyra in the 7th–6th century BC, and the site was likely already a place of worship because of its peculiar physical properties. The sanctuary of the "eternal fire" was also linked to an oracle. It probably passed to Apollonia at the time of the Apollonian victory towards Thronium (5th century B.C). An inscription found in Byllis, the chief city of the Bylliones, indicates the presence of the sanctuary with an oracle in the area. The presence of the fire sanctuary in the area is also attested in numismatics. The fire of the nymphaion is depicted on a bronze coin of Apollonia minted in the second half of the 4th century BC, on coins of Byllis minted in the 3rd-2nd century BC, and in many other local coins depicting the fire surrounded by nymphs.

In his description of the site Strabo (1st century BC – 1st century AD) reports that a fire arises from a stone, and underneath it exists a source of warm water and asphalt. Pliny the Younger (1st century AD), in his description based on the accounts of historian Theopompus (4th century BC), reports that even if the fire is located in the middle of a thick forest, it is very pleasant because it does not damage the greenery that surrounds it and the always lit crater of the nymphaion is located near a source of cold water. Pliny reports a public form of divination according to which the welfare of the Apolloniates was connected to the steadiness of the fire spring. He also gives the geographical position of the fire sanctuary: on the border of Apollonia, where the barbarians Amantini and Bylliones lived. Cassius Dio (2nd–3rd centuries AD) reports a description of the fire sanctuary including the practices related to the oracle provided by the great fire, giving a more detailed explanation of a private form of divination:

Dio also expressed in other accounts his wonder at the greenness and moistness of the site in spite of the presence of its fire.

The fire sanctuary was associated with the cult of the nymphs. A relief found near Byllis shows the nymphs and a cloth wrapped around the fire of the nymphaion. A similar scene is also represented on a 1st-century BC silver coin of Apollonia that depicts three nymphs dancing around the fire of the nymphaion. Of very ancient origin, the indigenous Illyrian cult of the nymphs influenced Apollonia. The continuation of the cult of the nymphs in the Roman imperial period in Apollonia is testified in a 2nd-century AD Greek inscription reporting Illyrian names.

In addition to the natural home of the nymphs, the site was also considered a beautiful, lush spot attractive to satyrs. According to a tale reported by Plutarch (1st–2nd century CE) in his Life of Sulla, a satyr fell asleep beside the nymphaion. The creature was captured there and brought to Sulla. The satyr was then questioned through many interpreters, but he was able to make only a horse cry. Disgusted by that sound, Sulla sent him away.

References

Bibliography 

Hellenistic Albania
Illyrian mythology
Illyrian Albania
Persistent natural fires